Alistair "Big Jack" Nicholson (born 4 March 1978) is a former Australian rules footballer, who played with the Melbourne Football Club in the Australian Football League (AFL). 

Nicholson was schooled at Scotch College, Perth, where he was school captain in his final year of 1995. He was also co-captain of the school's hockey team. Fellow AFL footballer Rowan Jones followed Nicholson as school captain in 1996. 

Making his debut in 1997 in the number 44  guernsey, the large figure of the man known as "Big Jack" was a strong presence in defence for the Demons. Nicholson, a specialist key position defender, was most suited to full-back and was much maligned during his career, described by critics as "old, slow and useless" and "unfashionable". However, Nicholson was shown a lot of faith by coach Neale Daniher, and was signed on until the end of the 2007 season.

The next year, however, saw a sharp decline in Nicholson's career. Due to the emergence of much-improved fullback Nathan Carroll, Nicholson was relegated to the Sandringham Zebras, Melbourne's VFL affiliate, for the entirety of the 2006 season. At the end of the year, he was delisted and his contract was paid out (which still had a year to run), effectively ending his AFL career.

During his time with Melbourne he served on the AFL Players' Association executive committee and began working with Gemba, a sports consulting firm. After his retirement from the AFL he continued with Gemba, working up to the position of head of entertainment strategy. In September 2014 Nicholson was announced as the new chief executive officer of the Australian Cricketers' Association. In March 2021 he was announced as the new Chief Executive Officer of the AFL’s Coaches Association.

Playing statistics

|- style="background-color: #EAEAEA"
! scope="row" style="text-align:center" | 1997
|
| 44 || 1 || 0 || 0 || 2 || 2 || 4 || 2 || 0 || 0 || 0.0 || 0.0 || 2.0 || 2.0 || 4.0 || 2.0 || 0.0 || 0.0
|-
! scope="row" style="text-align:center" | 1998
|
| 44 || 0 || — || — || — || — || — || — || — || — || — || — || — || — || — || — || — || —
|- style="background-color: #EAEAEA"
! scope="row" style="text-align:center" | 1999
|
| 44 || 13 || 0 || 0 || 22 || 31 || 53 || 17 || 5 || 107 || 0.0 || 0.0 || 1.7 || 2.4 || 4.1 || 1.3 || 0.4 || 8.2
|-
! scope="row" style="text-align:center" | 2000
|
| 44 || 16 || 0 || 0 || 52 || 81 || 133 || 45 || 21 || 34 || 0.0 || 0.0 || 3.3 || 5.1 || 8.3 || 2.8 || 1.3 || 2.1
|- style="background-color: #EAEAEA"
! scope="row" style="text-align:center" | 2001
|
| 8 || 22 || 1 || 0 || 76 || 116 || 192 || 65 || 24 || 45 || 0.0 || 0.0 || 3.5 || 5.3 || 8.7 || 3.0 || 1.1 || 2.0
|-
! scope="row" style="text-align:center" | 2002
|
| 8 || 11 || 2 || 1 || 41 || 38 || 79 || 40 || 13 || 7 || 0.2 || 0.1 || 3.7 || 3.5 || 7.2 || 3.6 || 1.2 || 0.6
|- style="background-color: #EAEAEA"
! scope="row" style="text-align:center" | 2003
|
| 8 || 10 || 0 || 0 || 35 || 37 || 72 || 30 || 10 || 3 || 0.0 || 0.0 || 3.5 || 3.7 || 7.2 || 3.0 || 1.0 || 0.3
|-
! scope="row" style="text-align:center" | 2004
|
| 8 || 23 || 0 || 0 || 81 || 98 || 179 || 60 || 25 || 4 || 0.0 || 0.0 || 3.5 || 4.3 || 7.8 || 2.6 || 1.1 || 0.2
|- style="background-color: #EAEAEA"
! scope="row" style="text-align:center" | 2005
|
| 8 || 14 || 0 || 0 || 47 || 43 || 90 || 36 || 19 || 4 || 0.0 || 0.0 || 3.4 || 3.1 || 6.4 || 2.6 || 1.4 || 0.3
|-
! scope="row" style="text-align:center" | 2006
|
| 8 || 0 || — || — || — || — || — || — || — || — || — || — || — || — || — || — || — || —
|- class="sortbottom"
! colspan=3| Career
! 110
! 3
! 1
! 356
! 446
! 802
! 295
! 117
! 204
! 0.0
! 0.0
! 3.2
! 4.1
! 7.3
! 2.7
! 1.1
! 1.9
|}

References

External links

Claremont Football Club players
1978 births
Living people
Melbourne Football Club players
Sandringham Football Club players
People educated at Scotch College, Perth
Australian rules footballers from Western Australia